Pradip Kumar Barma is an Indian politician from AITC. In May 2021, he was elected as the member of the West Bengal Legislative Assembly from Jalpaiguri.

Career
Barma is from Jalpaiguri district. His father's name is Kalisankar Barma. He passed MBBS from Nil Ratan Sircar Medical College and Hospital, in 1981. He contested in 2021 West Bengal Legislative Assembly election from Jalpaiguri Vidhan Sabha and won the seat on 2 May 2021.

References

Living people
Year of birth missing (living people)
21st-century Indian politicians
People from Jalpaiguri district
Trinamool Congress politicians from West Bengal
Trinamool Congress politicians
West Bengal MLAs 2021–2026